The athletics competition at the 1991 All-Africa Games was held from 23–27 September 1991 in Cairo, Egypt.

Medal summary

Men's events

In the men's 4 × 100 metres relay, a Sierra Leonan team of David Sawyer, Horace Dove-Edwin, Haroun Korjie, and Sanusi Turay originally finished as runners-up with a time of 39.66 seconds, but  were later disqualified for fielding an ineligible runner.
In the men's 4 × 400 metres relay, the Ugandan team originally finished third with a time of 3:07.72 minutes.

Women's events

Medal table

See also
1991 in athletics (track and field)

References
African Games. GBR Athletics. Retrieved 2020-03-28.
Sports Results and Details. Canberra Times (1991-09-26). Retrieved 2020-03-28.
Sports Results and Details. Canberra Times (1991-09-27). Retrieved 2020-03-28.
Sports Results and Details. Canberra Times (1991-09-27). Retrieved 2020-03-28.

 
1991
Athletics
All-Africa Games
1991 All-Africa Games
All-Africa Games
1991 African Games